Mersin Gymnstics Hall is an indoor sports hall for gymnastics events located at Yenişehir in Mersin, Turkey

The sports venue is located at Akkent neighborhood, 32nd St. 63 in Yenişehir, Mersin, to the east of Mersin University campus and to the south of Servet Tazegül Arena and Mersin Tennis Complex. It was built on a  land in 2013 for the 2013 Mediterranean Games. It has a total seating capacity of 1,288.

International events hosted
The hall hosted 2013 Mediterranean Games' artistic gymnastics between 18–24 June and rhythmic gymnastics events between 29–30 June.

The 2020 European Men's Artistic Gymnastics Championships will be held between 
9-13 December, and the 2020 European Women's Artistic Gymnastics Championships between 17-20 December 2020 at the venue.

References

Sports venues completed in 2013
2013 Mediterranean Games venues
Gymnastics venues
Sports venues in Mersin
Indoor arenas in Turkey
Yenişehir, Mersin
Gymnastics in Turkey